Three-ball (or "3-ball", colloquially) is a folk game of pool played with any three standard pool  and . The game is frequently gambled upon. The goal is to  the three object balls in as few shots as possible. The game involves a somewhat more significant amount of luck than either nine-ball or eight-ball, because of the disproportionate value of pocketing balls on the  shot and increased difficulty of doing so. In some areas and subcultures, such as the Asian-American youth-dominated pool hall scene of San Francisco, California, three-ball is a popular local tournament game.

Play 
There are no widespread official or standardized rules for three-ball, though local tournaments promulgate rulesets that have some sway over area player populations even outside the context of the tournaments. Below are listed the most common, widely accepted rules.

The game is played on any pool table. In a gambling context, three-ball is typically played in multiple games (each played out until someone wins the betting pool, then after new antes are placed, play begins again), sometimes for many hours, with players able to enter and leave as suits their finances and risk-aversion.

Object 
The object of the game is to sink all of the object balls in as few strokes as possible, with  being added to the player's score for each stroke and for specific fouls. Unlike in eight-ball and nine-ball which are alternating turn-based games, the player at turn remains at turn until all object balls are pocketed, or the player concedes or reaches the maximum point limit (see below). All strokes count as one point each, whether they pocketed no balls, one ball, or more than one ball.  incur additional penalty points (see below).

There is a predetermined cut-off score of a certain number of points, after which the player must turn the table over to the next player (or conclude the game/round if the player was the last in the lineup).

Winning 
Once a player's inning is over, the next player starts over with a fresh rack. After all players have finished, the player with the lowest score is declared to be the winner. In a tournament context, the winner of the event may be the player with the lowest total score over many rounds of play (strict scoring), or the highest number of won rounds (loose scoring). In case of a tie, a playoff round is played between the tied players (and repeated if another tie results).

The rack 

No particular arrangement is necessary, as there is no specific order in which the balls must be pocketed, nor do any of them have specific point values. As in other games, the player at turn may demand a  if not satisfied with the correct formation or position of the racked balls.

The break 
The players' turn order is decided at random at the beginning of the game or match, as in other several-player pool games. The break is the first  of a player's game, and thus counts toward their score. Any balls pocketed on the break are considered to be legally pocketed and the player now only has to sink the remaining balls.

Fouls 
Every foul of any kind costs the player an additional one-point penalty. A shot in which the player pocketed one or more object balls but also fouled still incurs a penalty.

Shots after a scratch must be taken from on or behind the head string and must go forward across/from the head string rather than be taken  anywhere on the table.

Object balls knocked off the table are spotted on the foot spot, and do not count as fouls.

Teams 
The game can be played as a team game in two ways. First, players can be divided into even teams, with each player on each team shooting a full game per round, and the scores within each team being combined to yield the final score. Secondly, the game can be played in  format, with players alternating shots, and each team only playing a single game per round, as if there were only two players.

History 
The modern game of three-ball appears to have originated from an earlier game of the same name, played as a rotation game with the 1 through 3 balls, and the same rules as nine-ball, but with the 3 taking the place of the 9. Its evolution over the last few decades into a turn-based game with rules more akin to those of straight pool can be traced back to 1984, in the Chicago suburbs, where JC Lee came up with three ball as a quick and fun way practice pool. He soon realized that several players, with varied billiard skill, could be involved in one turn-based game. The "one tie, all tie" rule, with re-ante betting rounds became an instant catalyst for the popularity of the game.

As practice for other games 

Some players use repetitive playing of solo three-ball as a form of practice. This form of practice is often used as a drill to hone position play with the final balls of a rack in eight-ball and nine-ball. An eight-ball practice variant is to use two solids or two stripes and the 8 ball, and shoot the 8 ball last, while practice for nine-ball will often use the 7, 8, and 9 balls shot in order.

References

Pool (cue sports)